Kartmazovo is a rural locality (a (selo)  in Andreyevskoye Rural Settlement, Sudogodsky District of Vladimir Oblast, Russia. Population:

Geography 
The village is located 22 km north-east from Sudogda.

References

Rural localities in Sudogodsky District
Sudogodsky Uyezd